The 1974 Individual Long Track World Championship was the fourth edition of the FIM speedway Individual Long Track World Championship. The event was held on 8 September 19743 in Scheeßel, West Germany.

The defending champion Ole Olsen was unable to defend his title because of an injury suffered during the 1974 Individual Speedway World Championship, two days previous. The world title was won by Egon Müller of West Germany.

Final Classification 

Key
 E = Eliminated (no further ride)
 F = Fell
 E/F = Engine Failure

References 

1974
Sport in West Germany
Sports competitions in West Germany
Motor
Motor